The 2004 PGA Championship was the 86th PGA Championship, played August 12–15 at the Straits Course of the Whistling Straits complex in Haven, Wisconsin (postal address Kohler). The purse was $6.25 million and the winner's share was $1.125 million.

Vijay Singh, the 1998 champion, earned his third and final major title in a three-hole aggregate playoff, defeating Justin Leonard and Chris DiMarco. At the time Singh, age 41, was third in the world rankings; the win moved him to #2 and he ascended to the top spot three weeks later, displacing Tiger Woods.

It was the first major championship at the expansive Straits Course, designed by Pete Dye and opened in 1998, which allowed high attendance and was highly profitable for the PGA of America. It set records with over 94,400 tickets sold and an overall attendance of 320,000 for the week. The overall economic impact was $76.9 million, shattering the previous record of $50.4 million in 2002, and nearly doubling that of 2003.

The PGA Championship returned just six years later, in 2010, displacing the more confined Sahalee Country Club near Seattle, which hosted in 1998, Singh's first major win. The admittance at Sahalee in 1998 was capped at 25,000 per day by the PGA of America. In early 2005, its chief executive officer, Jim Awtrey, cited the proximity to the 2010 Winter Olympics in Vancouver as the main reason for the retraction, and that Sahalee was targeted for 2012 to 2015 for another PGA Championship. Whistling Straits was awarded the 2010 event days later. The PGA of America has yet to commit to a return to Sahalee before 2028, but will return to the West in 2020 at San Francisco.

Field
All former PGA Champions.
Winners of the last five U.S. Opens.
Winners of the last five Masters.
Winners of the last five British Opens.
The 2003 Senior PGA Champion.
The low 15 scorers and ties in the 2003 PGA Championship.
The 25 low scorers in The 2004 PGA Club Professional Championship.
The 70 leaders in official money standings.
Members of the 2002 United States Ryder Cup Team.
Winners of tournaments co-sponsored or approved by the PGA Tour from the 2003 PGA Championship to the 2004 PGA Championship (does not include pro-am and team competitions).
The PGA of America reserves the right to invite additional players not included in the categories listed above.
The total field will be a maximum of 156 players. Vacancies will be filled by the first available player from the list of alternates (those below 70th place in official money standings).

Full eligibility list

History of the PGA Championship at Whistling Straits 
This was the first major championship held at Whistling Straits, and the Straits Course hosted the PGA Championship again in 2010, which also ended in a playoff, and 2015. It will host the Ryder Cup in 2020. The course also hosted the U.S. Senior Open in 2007, won by Brad Bryant.

This was the second PGA Championship (and major) in the state of Wisconsin; 71 years earlier, the 1933 edition was played at Blue Mound in Wauwatosa, just west of Milwaukee. The PGA Tour stopped in the state regularly with the Greater Milwaukee Open (1968–2009), preceded by the Milwaukee Open Invitational (1955–1961).

Course layout
Straits Course

Round summaries

First round 
Thursday, August 12, 2004

Led by Darren Clarke, 39 players broke par in Thursday opening round. Clarke birdied the first four holes and finished at 7-under-par 65. It was the lowest score under par in the first round of a major since Chris DiMarco had a 7-under 65 at the 2001 Masters. He was one stroke better than Justin Leonard and Ernie Els.

Second round 
Friday, August 13, 2004

Justin Leonard posted a 3-under 69 and Vijay Singh carded a 4-under 68 to share a one stroke lead at 9 under midway through the 86th PGA Championship. Opening round leader Darren Clarke shot a 1-under 71 and is tied for third with Ernie Els and Briny Baird. Tiger Woods made two straight birdies on 16 and 17 to avoid missing his first cut in 128 events. Miguel Ángel Jiménez, who shot the low round of the day of 65, ended in a tie for 13th at 3-under.

Third round 
Saturday, August 14, 2004

Vijay Singh shot 69 to reach 12 under par as he tried to add a third major title to his 1998 PGA Championship and 2000 Masters. Justin Leonard carded 70 and was at 11 under. Leonard, who had a two-shot lead after making a 6-foot birdie on the 12th, bogeyed  Nos. 15 and 18 to keep him one behind. Briny Baird, the leader at one point, pulled his tee shot over the cliff left of the par-3 17th and wound up with a triple bogey to knocked him out of contention. He wound up with a 75 and was seven shots behind.

Final round 
Sunday, August 15, 2004

An exciting final round filled with missed opportunities led to a three-man playoff between Vijay Singh, Chris DiMarco and Justin Leonard. Ernie Els missed the playoff by one stroke, thanks to a bogey at No. 18, and completed a disheartening season of near-misses in the majors. He finished fourth, tied with Chris Riley who also bogeyed No. 18. Els finished second in the Masters, second in the British Open and ninth in the U.S. Open.

Phil Mickelson also had a chance to get into the playoff, needing a birdie at the 72nd hole. Mickelson however took bogey and added a sixth-place finish to his memorable run at the majors in 2004. Mickelson won the Masters, took second in the U.S. Open and placed third in the British Open. K.J. Choi also had a chance to get into the playoff with a birdie, but also bogeyed the 72nd hole to finish two strokes behind.  Tiger Woods bogeyed two of the first four holes and wound up with a 73, his worst finish in the majors this year, and extended his streak to 10 majors without winning, which was the longest drought of his career at that time. He won the next major, his fourth green jacket at the Masters, in 2005.

Leonard, playing in the final group at the PGA Championship for the third time, took a two-shot lead with five holes to play with an  birdie putt on 13. Leonard missed four putts inside  down the stretch including a 12-foot par putt on No. 18 which would have given him his second major championship. DiMarco, the only player in the final nine groups to break par, had an 18-foot birdie putt to win on the 72nd hole that he left short. He also lost in a playoff in the next major, to Woods at Augusta, and ended his career without a major victory.

Source:

Scorecard
Final round

Cumulative tournament scores, relative to par

Source:

Playoff 
After 72 holes, Singh, DiMarco and Leonard were tied on 8 under par, requiring a three-hole aggregate playoff, over the 10th, 17th, and 18th holes.

Singh then laced a 3-iron to within 6 feet on the  par-3 17th, but missed the putt and all three men made par. Leonard and DiMarco needed to gain a stroke on Singh on the par-4 18th and neither came close — DiMarco in a bunker, Leonard so far away that he used a wedge to chip on the green. Neither finished the hole, and Singh's par secured his second PGA Championship and third career major. His 76 on Sunday was the highest final-round score ever by a PGA champion.

Scorecard
Playoff

Cumulative playoff scores, relative to par

Quotes

References

External links
PGA Championship Official site 
Whistling Straits official site 
USA Today coverage

PGA Championship
Golf in Wisconsin
PGA Championship
PGA Championship
PGA Championship